Sir Robert Vere Darwin KCB CBE RA RSA (7 May 1910 – 30 January 1974), known as Robin Darwin, was a British artist, President of the Royal Society of Painters in Watercolours, and Rector of the Royal College of Art.

He was the son of the golf writer Bernard Darwin and his wife the engraver Elinor Monsell. One of his sisters was the potter Ursula Mommens. He was a great-grandson of the naturalist Charles Darwin. In 1931, he married artist Yvonne Darby (1900? – 1985). After their divorce, he later married Ginette Hewitt  who had been previously married to Lt-Col Kenneth Morton-Evans, OBE, TD and Bar, by whom she had two children, a son, Michael and a daughter, Angela.

This charcoal of Robin Darwin was sketched by Canadian artist Arthur Lismer, a member of the Group of Seven. It was given by Darwin to John Bland, former head of McGill's School of Architecture and later Bland gave it to Norman Slater, who studied Architecture at McGill and Industrial Design at the RCA around the same time it was drawn in the early 1950s.

References

Sources
‘DARWIN, Sir Robin (Robert Vere Darwin)’,   Who Was Who,  A & C Black,   1920–2008;     online edn,   Oxford University Press, Dec 2007       accessed 19 Jan 2012
R. Y. Goodden, ‘Darwin, Sir  Robert Vere [Robin]  (1910–1974)’, rev. Oxford Dictionary of National Biography, Oxford University Press, 2004; online edn, May 2006 accessed                                                                        Sir  Robert Vere Darwin (1910–1974):

External links 
 

1910 births
1974 deaths
Knights Commander of the Order of the Bath
Commanders of the Order of the British Empire
Rectors of the Royal College of Art
People educated at Eton College
Charles Darwin
20th-century British painters
British male painters
Royal Academicians